Reyes Etla is a town and municipality in Oaxaca in south-western Mexico. The municipality covers an area of 24.24 km2. It is part of the Etla District in the Valles Centrales region.

As of 2005, the municipality had a total population of 3,252.

Municipal President Victorino Javier Santiago Ruiz died in 2020 during the COVID-19 pandemic in Mexico.

References

Municipalities of Oaxaca